Amir Mehdi Janmaleki (born 1 February 1999) is an Iranian football player who plays as defender for the Persian Gulf Pro League club f.c.nassaji mazandaran. His grandfather, Ezzat, played for Taj SC and Iran national team.

References

External links
 

1999 births
Living people
Iranian footballers
Tractor S.C. players
Association football defenders